The North Eastern Railway Class S3, classified B16 by the LNER, was a class of 4-6-0 steam locomotive designed for mixed traffic work.  It was designed by Vincent Raven and introduced in 1920. The earlier members of this class were fitted with Westinghouse Brakes - all of this equipment was removed during the 1930s.

History
After World War I, the NER experienced an increase in both freight and passenger traffic. The North Eastern Railway's express goods services were being handled by the S Class (LNER B13), S1 Class (LNER B14), and S2 Class (LNER B15) 4-6-0s, which were difficult to operate and had a high coal consumption. After superheating, all three classes proved to be much more free-steaming. However, the locomotives still struggled to keep to time with the increase in traffic. Meanwhile, express passenger traffic was being handled by the V and V/09 Classes (LNER C6) and Z Class (LNER C7) Atlantics, as well as the R Class (LNER D20) and R1 Class (LNER D21) 4-4-0s. Even though the Atlantics were doing well, the 4-4-0s were also starting to struggle with the increasing train loads. The solution came in 1919, when the NER's chief mechanical engineer, Vincent Raven came up with a 4-6-0 that could be used on both express passenger trains and express goods trains. To provide a good balance between speed and adhesion, 5-foot 8-inch driving wheels were chosen. The NER's three-cylinder layout was also used to provide plenty of power and speed. This arrangement had been used by Raven's predecessor, Wilson Worsdell and first used on his X Class (LNER T1) 4-8-0 Tanks of 1909 and his Y Class (LNER A7) Pacific Tanks of 1910. All three cylinders used Stephenson link motion. On the Y Class, the cylinders drove the front driving axle; on the X Class, meanwhile, they drove the second axle. In both cases, this provided a powerful locomotive that was also easy to maintain and repair. The boiler would also be interchangeable with the T3 Class (LNER Q7) 0-8-0s, much like the S2s, which had interchangeable wheels and cylinders with the S Class and interchangeable cylinders and boilers with the T2 Class (LNER Q6) 0-8-0s. The result was the S3 Class (LNER B16), with the first five members, Nos. 840-844 appearing in December 1919 from Darlington Works.

Post-NER
Seventy S3/B16 locomotives were built between 1919 and 1924. The NER began numbering this class in the range No. 840 through to No. 943 (though not contiguously), those built after late 1922 (from No. 2365 onwards) directly receiving their LNER number. By the Groupings of 1923, thirty-eight locomotives passed to the London and North Eastern Railway (LNER), which built thirty-two more starting with No. 2366 on 4 January 1923 and ending with Nos. 1384 and 1385 on 1 January 1924. Twenty-four of the class were rebuilt starting in the 1930s and 1940s. The original Raven-designed locomotives were designated class B16/1. Gresley rebuilt seven of the B16/1s, becoming class B16/2. Thompson, meanwhile, ordered seventeen B16/1s be rebuilt, these being designated class B16/3. Under the LNER, the B16s hardly ever left the North East. Their duties included fast freights, express passenger trains, excursions to Scarborough, and even football specials. During World War II, some of the B16s moved to the Great Central Main Line, working around Banbury and Woodford Halse After World War II, the B16s were used on their pre-war duties but were also used as far south as Peterborough, where they substituted for a failed V2 2-6-2 or a Thompson B1. The 1940s also saw the entire class receive new boilers, the last one being refitted in the late 1950s. Under the LNER renumbering scheme, of 1946, they received numbers 1400-1468. All but one of the B16s survived into BR ownership, being renumbered 61400-61468. (Nos. 61400-61409 were later renumbered 61469-61478 to give their old numbers to the last ten of Thompson's B1 Class).

Withdrawals
One locomotive, No. 925, was badly damaged (along with A4 4469 Sir Ralph Wedgwood) during a German air-raid on York on 29 April 1942, and was subsequently scrapped. The first official withdrawal was B16/1 No. 61474 from Selby on 20 January 1958. Given the class's age and with the Modernisation Plan already in full swing, withdrawals were rapid. The last, of any variety of the B16s, was B16/2 No. 61435, being withdrawn on 21 July 1964. The last member to be scrapped was B16/3 No. 61472 on 9 November 1964; none have been preserved.

Sub-classes

 B16/1 Introduced 1920, NER design by Vincent Raven with inside Stephenson valve gear.
 B16/2 Introduced 1937, LNER rebuilds of B16/1 by Nigel Gresley with Walschaerts valve gear on the outside cylinders and Gresley conjugated valve gear on the inside cylinder.
 B16/3 Introduced 1944, LNER rebuilds of B16/1 by Edward Thompson with three sets of Walschaerts valve gear and left-hand drive.

Accidents and incidents
Twenty-five people were killed and 45 were injured.
On 5 January 1946, (Browney rail crash) locomotive No. 842 was hauling a freight train which became divided on the East Coast Main Line in County Durham. The train was brought to a halt at Browney Signalbox, but the rear portion crashed into it. The wreckage fouled signal cables, giving a false clear to a passenger train coming in the opposite direction. This train then collided with the wreckage. Ten people were killed and eight were severely injured.

See also
Locomotives of the North Eastern Railway

References

Source

External links 
 LNER encyclopedia
 Class B16/1 Details at Rail UK
 Class B16/2 Details at Rail UK
 Class B16/3 Details at Rail UK
https://www.brdatabase.info/locoqry.php?action=class&id=600216&type=S&page=main
https://www.brdatabase.info/locoqry.php?action=class&id=600216&type=S&page=fleet

S3
4-6-0 locomotives
Railway locomotives introduced in 1920
Scrapped locomotives
Standard gauge steam locomotives of Great Britain
2′C h3 locomotives